Nolan Laufenberg (born March 25, 1999) is an American football guard for the Washington Commanders of the National Football League (NFL). He played college football at Air Force and signed with the Denver Broncos as an undrafted free agent in 2021.

Early life and education
Nolan Laufenberg was born on March 25, 1999, in Castle Rock, Colorado. He attended Castle View High School there, earning three varsity letters in football and two in basketball. He was all-conference on offense in football in three of his four years, being twice on the first-team. Following his senior year of 2016, Laufenberg went to the United States Air Force Academy, to play for their Falcon football team. As a true freshman in 2016, Laufenberg did not see any varsity action.

As a sophomore in 2018, Laufenberg appeared in twelve games, and started nine. He played all thirteen games the following year, starting all but one. He was named first-team all-Mountain West Conference and first-team all-Colorado following the season. The 2020 season was shortened due to COVID-19, only allowing him to play six games.

Professional career

Denver Broncos
After going unselected in the 2021 NFL Draft, Laufenberg was signed by the Denver Broncos as an undrafted free agent. In order to play with Denver, he had to get the United States Secretary of Defense's approval to delay his military service five years. He was waived on August 24, 2021.

Washington Football Team / Commanders
On September 28, 2021, Laufenberg was signed to the Washington Football Team's practice squad. He signed a reserve/future contract after the 2021 regular season ended.

On August 30, 2022, Laufenberg was waived by the Commanders and signed to the practice squad the next day. On January 4, 2023, he was activated off the injured list. Five days later, he signed another reserve/future contract.

References

External links
Washington Commanders bio

Players of American football from Colorado
American football offensive guards
1999 births
Living people
Air Force Falcons football players
Denver Broncos players
Washington Football Team players
Washington Commanders players